Wincent Weiss (born 21 January 1993) is a German singer, and  was first known for taking part in  in 2013.

Career

2013–2017: Irgendwas gegen die Stille 
In 2013, Weiss participated in the tenth season of the German talent show Deutschland sucht den Superstar, the German adaptation of the Idol franchise. After a successful audition, he became one of the top 29 contestants but failed to make it to the live shows. In 2015, German DJ duo Gestört aber GeiL and Koby Funk produced a remix of his rendition of "Unter meiner Haut", an acoustic cover of Elif Demirezer's same-titled song which Weiss had previously uploaded on YouTube. The song peaked as number six on the German Singles Chart and earned a platinum certification by the Bundesverband Musikindustrie (BVMI).

Before he received his first record deal, he was a waiter and a model. He has been represented by Tune Models in Cologne. During the fashion week for the spring/summer 2016 season, he walked as an exclusive for Versace menswear.

Weiss's first solo single "Regenbogen" was released the same year but failed to chart. In 2016, he released the single "Musik sein", which was a success in the German-speaking part of Europe, becoming a top ten hit in Austria and Switzerland. Follow-up "Feuerwerk", released in 2017, entered the top thirty in Germany and Switzerland and preceded his first studio album Irgendwas gegen die Stille, released in April 2017. A commercial success, it peaked at number three in Germany and at number four in Switzerland, eventually going platinum in both countries. A reissue of the album was released later that year. In May 2017, Weiss served as a member of Germany's jury at the 62nd Eurovision Song Contest in Kyiv, Ukraine. In November, he was awarded the MTV Europe Music Award for Best German Act.

2018–present: Irgendwie anders 

In April 2018, Weiss won the Echo Award in the National Newcomer category. He was also nominated for National Pop Artist. The same month, he released his single "An Wunder," the lead single from his second album Irgendwie anders. It reached the top 20 of the German Singles Chart and gained gold status in Germany. Also that year, Weiss voiced the titular character in a German animated fantasy family film Tabaluga, based on the media franchise of the same name created by musician Peter Maffay. Irgendwie anders was released in March 2019 and peaked at number two in Germany and Switzerland. As with "An Wunder," it was certified gold by the BVMI and produced five further singles, including "Hier mit dir." The same year, Weiss participated in the sixth season of the German reality television show Sing meinen Song – Das Tauschkonzert, the German adaptation of The Best Singers franchise. In 2020, Weiss released the previously unreleased single "Sag so," a collaboration with Achtabahn.

Discography

Albums

Singles

As featured artist

Promotional singles

Other charted songs

Awards and nominations

Results

Notes

References

1993 births
21st-century German male singers
German male models
German pop singers
Living people
Musicians from Schleswig-Holstein
People from Bad Oldesloe
People from Eutin